Yuzhou is a district and the seat of the city of Yulin, in the Guangxi Zhuang Autonomous Region, People's Republic of China, and, as its only district, is synonymous with Yulin's urban area.

Administrative divisions
Yuzhou District is divided into 5 subdistricts and 10 towns:

Subdistricts:
Yucheng Subdistrict (玉城街道), Nanjiang Subdistrict (南江街道), Chengxi Subdistrict (城西街道), Chengbei Subdistrict (城北街道), Mingshan Subdistrict (名山街道)

Towns:
Datang (大塘镇), Maolin (茂林镇), Rendong (仁东镇), Fumian (福绵镇), Chengjun (成均镇), Zhangmu (樟木镇), Xinqiao (新桥镇), Shatian (沙田镇), Shihe (石和镇), Renhou (仁厚镇)

References

External links

County-level divisions of Guangxi
Yulin, Guangxi